Incheon Shinhan Bank S-Birds is a professional basketball club in the Women's Korean Basketball League in South Korea.

Honours

Women's Korean Basketball League 

WKBL Championship
 Winners (8): 2002 (summer), 2005 (summer), 2007 (winter), 2007–08, 2008–09, 2009–10, 2010–11, 2011–12
 Runners-up (6): 1999 (summer), 2000 (winter), 2000 (summer), 2001 (summer), 2006 (winter), 2013–14

WKBL Regular Season
 Winners (6): 2007 (winter), 2007–08, 2008–09, 2009–10, 2010–11, 2011–12
 Runners-up (9): 1999 (summer), 2000 (winter), 2000 (summer), 2001 (summer), 2002 (summer), 2006 (winter), 2012–13, 2013–14, 2014–15

References

External links
 Official website 

Basketball teams established in 1986
Basketball teams in South Korea
Women's basketball teams in South Korea
Women's Korean Basketball League teams
Sport in Incheon
1986 establishments in South Korea